Gailan Mahmoud Ramiz (January, 1933 - April 2004) was a prominent political scientist and politician from Iraq. He served as Iraqi ambassador in the UN and he is one of the few academicians to hold degrees from Harvard, Princeton and Oxford universities.

Biography
He was born in Baghdad, Iraq, in the family of an Ottoman army officer, who served as a member of Baghdad parliament. 
He died in 2004 in a bomb explosion in Baghdad.

Education
The young Gailan was sent to school in Egypt, becoming part of the first generation of Iraqis to be educated abroad. 
 Bachelor's degree in law at Princeton in 1958 
 MA at Harvard 
 DPhil at Oxford in 1973.

Professional career
In 1980 he was elected as the Chairman of the UN Special Committee on Enhancing the Effectiveness of the Principle of Non-Use of Force in International Relations. He taught political science at universities in Jordan, Malaysia and Iraq. 

From 1993 to 2000, he was professor of international politics and diplomacy at IIUM.

Before his death in 2004 he served as professor of international relations at Baghdad University. 

He was a regular commentator in the international media during the Iraqi war. His book "The political process and the future of the Muslim world" was published in Malaysia in 2000.

References

Iraqi politicians
Iraqi academics
People from Baghdad
1933 births
2004 deaths
Academic staff of the International Islamic University Malaysia
Academic staff of the University of Baghdad
Princeton University alumni
Harvard University alumni
Alumni of the University of Oxford
Civilian casualties in the Iraq War
Iraq War casualties
International relations scholars